Kuitpo Forest is a plantation forest in South Australia located about  south-east of the Adelaide city centre.

Kuipto, the first of many forest plantations in the Mount Lofty Ranges, was established in 1898 to ensure a sustainable timber supply for South Australia. The forest of radiata pine (Pinus radiata},  serves as both a community forest and a commercial venture. Kuitpo is one of the more popular plantation forests; it is regularly frequented by locals and tourists alike, as an escape to nature. It is equipped with many walking trails, and a ForestrySA interpretive centre provides insight into both the forest ecology and the history of Kuitpo. The Heysen Trail runs through the forest, popular for any South Australian hiker, as well as being popular for bike rides, camping, picnics and also a great place to go horse riding or foraging for mushrooms.

Attempts at growing native timbers were largely abandoned as they proved too slow-growing. Instead, the tree of choice became radiata pine, a California native, although many other timbers are still grown. Native forest is found in small areas with the designated forest but also in nearby conservation parks, such as Mount Magnificent Conservation Park and Kyeema Conservation Park. Most of the remaining surrounding area is farm land, mainly for cattle.

Travel to the area from Adelaide is relatively fast and easy. A tourist route begins at a turnoff from South Road at O'Halloran Hill, onto Chandlers Hill Road. From here signs direct the visitor through Clarendon to Meadows. The area is also approachable from the south through Willunga.

Climate
Kuitpo Forest has a hot summer Mediterranean climate (Köppen climate classification: Csa).

References

External links 
 Mount Lofty Ranges Forests

Forests of South Australia